John Vaughan (by 1512 – 25 June 1577) was an English politician.

Vaughan was a Member of the Parliament of England for Herefordshire in 1542, Horsham in 1547, Surrey in 1547, Petersfield in March 1553, April 1554 and November 1554, Bletchingley in 1555, Hedon in 1559, Northumberland in 1563, Dartmouth in 1571 and Grantham in 1572.

References

1577 deaths
Members of the Parliament of England for Hedon
English MPs 1542–1544
Year of birth uncertain
English MPs 1547–1552
English MPs 1553 (Edward VI)
English MPs 1554
English MPs 1554–1555
English MPs 1555
English MPs 1559
English MPs 1563–1567
English MPs 1571
English MPs 1572–1583
Members of the Parliament of England for Dartmouth